Diane Smith may refer to:
 Diane Shader Smith, American writer, publicist, and cystic fibrosis advocate
 Diane Ellingson Smith, American gymnast, teacher, and speaker

See also
 Diane Smith-Gander, Australian business executive